Vinařice is a municipality and village in Mladá Boleslav District in the Central Bohemian Region of the Czech Republic. It has about 300 inhabitants.

Geography
It lies mostly in the Jičín Uplands, the southern part of the municipal territory extends into the Jizera Table.

History
The first written mention of Vinařice is in a deed of Agnes of Bohemia from 1227, when it was a property of the Convent of Saint George in Prague. Soon it became property of the lords of Chlum, who held it until 1403, after that it changed owners frequently. The most notable owners of Vinařice were the Waldstein family (1623–1734), who joined it to the Dobrovice estate.

Sights
The main landmark of Vinařice is the Vinařice Castle. It was created by the Renaissance rebuilding of the old fortress, which took place in two phases in the 16th century and around 1630. Later, Baroque modifications were made. Today it is privately owned and used for social purposes and as a hotel.

References

External links

Villages in Mladá Boleslav District